Julinho may refer to:

 Julinho (footballer, born 1919) (1919–2010), Júlio Correia da Silva, Portuguese football forward
 Julinho (footballer, born 1929) (1929–2003), Júlio Botelho, Brazilian football right winger
 Julinho (footballer, born 1965), Julio César de Andrade Moura, Peruvian football striker
 Julinho (footballer, born 1979), Júlio César Teixeira, Brazilian football left-back
 Julinho (footballer, born 1986), Júlio César Godinho Catole, Brazilian football left-back
 Julinho (footballer, born 1987), Júlio César Machado Colares, Brazilian football left-back
 Julinho Camargo (born 1971), Brazilian football manager
 Julinho Mboane (born 1984), Mozambican football midfielder

See also
 Julinho Sporting F.C., a Namibian football club